Agriphila bleszynskiella is a moth in the family Crambidae. It was described by Hans Georg Amsel in 1961. It is found in Iran, Afghanistan, and Turkey.

References

Crambini
Moths described in 1961
Moths of Asia